Harzandat-e Gharbi Rural District is in the Central District of Marand County, East Azerbaijan province, Iran. At the National Census of 2006, its population was 6,194 in 1,633 households. There were 5,652 inhabitants in 1,818 households at the following census of 2011. At the most recent census of 2016, the population of the rural district was 5,094 in 1,759 households. The largest of its 13 villages was Galin Qayah, with 1,990 people.

References 

Marand County

Rural Districts of East Azerbaijan Province

Populated places in East Azerbaijan Province

Populated places in Marand County